Issikiomartyria nudata is a species of moth belonging to the family Micropterigidae. It was described by Syuti Issiki in 1953. It is known from Japan.

References

Micropterigidae
Moths described in 1953
Moths of Japan